"Wait for the Blackout" is a single by English punk rock band The Damned. Initially, Chiswick issued Wait for the Blackout instead of The History of the World (Part 1) as a single to promote The Black Album (1980) in Spain, with "Dr Jekyll & Mr Hyde" as the B-side.

In 1982, their Big Beat budget imprint reissued the track as a single in the UK, despite The Damned having left the label two years previously. The B-side was provided by Damned guitarist Captain Sensible's spin-off project, Captain Sensible and the Softies, in the form of "Jet Boy Jet Girl". This was a cover version of the 1977 recording by Elton Motello, which shared its backing track with Plastic Bertrand's "Ça plane pour moi". The writing credit for Ward refers to Motello, real name Alan Ward, not ex-Damned bass player Algy Ward.

"Wait for the Blackout" was covered by The Goo Goo Dolls for the Tommy Boy soundtrack. It finally saw release on The Goo Goo Dolls' Greatest Hits Volume 2, released on August 19, 2008. It was covered by Alkaline Trio on BYO Split Series, Vol. 5 as well as on the 2007 release Remains.

Track listing (UK release)
 "Wait for the Blackout" (Scabies, Sensible, Vanian, Gray, Karloff) - 3:57
 "Looking at You (Live)" (Deprijck, Lacomblez, Ward) - 3:54

Production credits
 Producers:
 The Damned ("Wait for the Blackout")
 Jan Reitman ("Jet Boy Jet Girl")
 Musicians:

"Wait for the Blackout"
 Dave Vanian: Vocals
 Captain Sensible: Guitar, Vocals on "I Believe the Impossible"
 Rat Scabies: Drums
 Paul Gray: Bass

"Jet Boy Jet Girl"
 Captain Sensible: Vocals
 'Big Mick': Guitar, Vocals
 'Joe Thumper': Drums
 'Frank N Stein': Bass

External links

1980 songs
1982 singles
The Damned (band) songs
Songs written by Rat Scabies
Songs written by Captain Sensible
Songs written by David Vanian